Kali Bari Chhindwara is a temple dedicated to Goddess Kali and the center of Bengali culture in Chhindwara, India. Established in 1995, the deity in the temple is Maa Kali.

The temple is one of its kinds in Central India with its unique architecture that resembles the famous Dakshineswar Kali Temple near Kolkata.

Devotees from all of religions and castes come during worship at the temple.

Location
The temple is located on the Kali Bari Road, Dharam Tekri, Chhindwara.

How to Reach
The temple is located in the heart of Chhindwara city. Chhindwara is well reachable by rail or road from adjacent cities Nagpur, Jabalpur & Bhopal and rest of the India. Chhindwara railway station & City Bus Terminal both are 2 km far from the temple. The nearest airports are Chhindwara (5 km) & Nagpur (120 km).

Culture
On various occasion like Kali Puja (Diwali), Durga Puja, Sankranti & Navaratri thousands of devotees are gathered at the temple for worship. Various festivals like Bengali New Year, Ravindra Jayanti, Shri Ram Krishna Jayanti, Vivekananda Jayanti are organized at here. Bengali people of Chhindwara District are also arranged various get together and cultural programs at the community hall of the temple.

History
After several years of demands by the people from all of the religions of Chhindwara District for construction of a Kali Bari at Chhindwara City, an action plan was drawn to form a committee with the name Kali Bari Nirman Samiti. The initial goal to the committee was to make a plan for construction of temple & organizing fund. Later on committee was worked for selection of site, making blue print of drawings, and take necessary actions for construction of temple.

Like any major rivers originating as a small stream, Kali Bari Nirman Samiti, Chhindwara also had a humble beginning. In 1995, when a group of enthusiastic members of Bengali Durga Puja Committee Chhindwara, the oldest Bengali cultural organization of the district, take initiative with an objective for constructing a Kali temple at Chhindwara.

Subsequently, with the overwhelming support and participation of all residents of district, the construction of the exquisitely beautiful pristine white marble store complex was completed and idols of Maa Kali was installed in the sanctum sanctorum of the new temple with all religious rituals. Later on idol of Lord Shiva was established in a newly constructed Shiva Temple.

Administration
Kali Bari Chhindwara is controlled by a local governing committee known as Kali Bari Nirman Samiti. Most of the committee members are from city Bengali association and from all of the religions also.

The committee is responsible for arranging fund, taking various legal approvals, co-ordination with district administration, organizing various kinds of activities, controlling over the crowd during festivals, Daily Puja & Aarti, organizing bhog-prasad after puja, informing the community about dates and schedules, maintenance & renovation and Safety & Security of temple property.

Tourism Attraction
Kali Bari is situated on a plateau, surrounded by the lush green fields, rivers and sagaun trees. It is surrounded by dense forest with diverse flora and fauna.

Several National Parks are nearby located from the temple, including the Kanha, Pench,  Satpura National Park, Pachmarhi Biosphere Reserve, Bori Reserve Forest etc.

Orange city Nagpur (120 km), Marvel city Jabalpur (205 km) & Lake city Bhopal (325 km) are the nearby metro cities. Patalkot, India (60 km) and Pachmarhi (130 km) are the nearest Hill Station.

Note
Temple committee has celebrated various festivals like Indian Independence Day celebration, Indian Republic Day celebration etc. Recently Kali Bari Chhindwara has organized a free dental check-up campaign for the residential of Chhindwara. During Navaratri festival devotees light Jyoti Kalash, in temple premises to appease Devi.

See also
Kali
Kalighat Kali Temple
Dakshineswar Kali Temple

External links

Hindu temples in Madhya Pradesh
Kali temples
Bengali culture
Chhindwara
20th-century Hindu temples